Cyberbully (stylized as cyberbu//y) is a teen drama television film that premiered on ABC Family (now Freeform) on July 17, 2011. The channel collaborated with Seventeen magazine to make the film, stating that they hoped it would "delete digital drama" in a press release. The film tells the story of a teenage girl who is bullied online. The film was released on DVD on February 7, 2012.

Plot
Taylor Hillridge is a teenage girl who lives in St. Louis, Missouri, with her single mother, Kris, and her younger brother, Eric. She is close friends with two other girls, Samantha Caldone and Cheyenne Mortenson. Earlier, Taylor made a seemingly innocuous comment to one of her classmates, Lindsay Fordyce, to which Lindsay took great offense.

For her 17th birthday, Taylor is given a computer by her mother. At first, Taylor is excited by the independence of going online without her mother always watching her. Meanwhile, her crush, Scott, asks her to the dance, to which she says yes. Cheyenne is happy for her, but Samantha does not like Scott because she previously went out with his friend, who later dumped her after he had sex with her. Taylor soon finds herself the victim of cyberbullying when she becomes a member of a social website named Cliquesters.

Things begin to go wrong when Eric hacks into her account and writes "I'm a naughty girl, somebody should spank me" on her profile, having been angry at her when she refused to let him use the laptop. She condemns him for the hacking and Eric is then severely punished by Kris. Students at school write horrid comments about her and she becomes afraid to face her friends at school. Taylor also meets a boy named James online and thinks he is just being nice, but winds up spreading a rumor that Taylor slept with him and ended up giving him "the clap". Taylor gets pegged as a "slut" and "whore" as a result of the bullying. The abuse that Taylor receives from the hands of her schoolmates pushes her to a breaking point. Scott also tells Taylor that he cannot take her to the dance because of an excuse that obviously sounds made up (that his mother is forcing him to take another girl) and Cheyenne and Samantha begin to turn their backs on Taylor.

Overcome with depression, Taylor posts a video online saying that she can no longer live with herself. Samantha sees this and quickly goes to Taylor's house and finds her trying to commit suicide by overdosing with pills, but cannot get the cap off; in the ensuing scuffle, the pill bottle spills on the floor, scattering pills over the bathroom floor. Taylor is then sent to a hospital. Taylor's mother learns of the incident and takes on the school system and state legislation to prevent others from experiencing the same problem as her daughter. Taylor's mother recommends that she go to a support group and obtain help. Meanwhile, Samantha finds Scott at a cafe and insults him for leaving Taylor. Taylor finds that Caleb, one of her classmates who is gay, is going through the same exact thing, only he is targeted for his sexuality. Taylor finds support in the group and deals with the bullying much better. Samantha confesses to Taylor that she was the one who created the "James" profile and set Taylor up. Samantha feels guilty and becomes a victim of cyberbullying herself. Taylor finds out about this and tells her about her support group and eventually forgives Samantha, rekindling their friendship.

Samantha and Taylor return to school, where they are quickly teased by Lindsay in the cafeteria. Samantha urges Taylor to ignore her, but Taylor does the opposite and confronts Lindsay, calling her out for her online abuse. Scott, Cheyenne and Caleb appear and side with Taylor, condemning Lindsay for her bullying. Their actions are received well with other students present in the cafeteria, who spread the word about Taylor's courage and Lindsay's misdeeds, eroding Lindsay's support within the student body. Meanwhile, the state legislature passes a bill criminalizing cyberbullying, which is then signed into law in honor of Taylor and all victims of bullying.

Cast

Reception
The film received a generally positive review from Common Sense Media, who gave the film a 4 out of 5 star rating, stating "Cyberbully is a great jumping-off point for talking to teens about the very real dangers that exist online. The movie does a good job of working in most of the hot-button issues related to this topic, including the anonymity that exists online, the legal loopholes that enable cyberbullying, the social pressure on teens to partake in digital relationships, and the emotional devastation that bullying inflicts on its victims and their families."

Cyberbully gained 3.4 million views on its official release date. It was TV's number-one telecast for the 8-10 p.m. time slot and became the week's number-one TV film, and the second most viewed TV film of the 2010 and 2011 season. The film has gained popularity in recent years through online streaming, with an unofficial upload of the film on YouTube having amassed over 79 million views.

Promotion
ABC Family created "badges" that people could add to their profile pictures on sites like Twitter and Facebook; the badge says "[delete] digital drama!".

On July 14, 2011, ABC Family hosted a live event called "The Rally to Delete Digital Drama" in Glendale, California. The rally included appearances from Shay Mitchell, Tyler Blackburn, Daren Kagasoff, Skyler Samuels, Grey Damon, Katie Leclerc, Vanessa Marano, Emily Osment, and more. Emily Osment performed her song "Drift", as well as other songs. There was also an autograph signing and gift giveaways.

Music
Emily Osment released a song called "Drift" which was featured in the film. It was released on July 12, 2011. The film also features "Breathe Me" by Sia. Television spots of the film contain the song "Perfect" by Pink.

Awards and nominations

See also

Megan Meier

References

External links
 
 

2011 television films
2011 drama films
2011 films
2010s American films
2010s Canadian films
2010s high school films
2010s teen drama films
ABC Family original films
American drama television films
American high school films
American teen drama films
Canadian drama television films
Canadian high school films
Canadian teen drama films
Films about cyberbullying
Films about school bullying
Films directed by Charles Binamé
Films set in St. Louis
Films shot in Montreal